The team eventing in equestrian at the 2012 Olympic Games in London was held at Greenwich Park from 28 to 31 July.

The German team of Peter Thomsen, Dirk Schrade, Ingrid Klimke, Sandra Auffarth and Michael Jung won the gold medal. Great Britain won the silver medal and New Zealand took bronze.

Competition format

The team and individual eventing competitions used the same scores.  Eventing consisted of a dressage test, a cross-country test, and a jumping test. The jumping test had two rounds, with only the first used for the team competition. Team eventing final scores were the sum of the three best overall individual scores (adding the three components) from the five-pair teams.

Schedule

All times are British Summer Time (UTC+1)

Results

Standings after dressage 

Note: The team penalties given above are for the top three in each team at this stage and may not tally with the final total scores. The final results are determined by adding the total scores of the top three team members at the end of the competition.

Standings after cross-country 

Note: The team penalties given above are for the top three in each team at this stage and may not tally with the final total scores. The final results are determined by adding the total scores of the top three team members at the end of the competition.

Standings after jumping (Final Standings) 

Final results below, determined by combining the three best overall scores for each team.

References

Team eventing